Charles Bennet, 1st Earl of Tankerville  (1674 – 21 May 1722), known as The Lord Ossulston between 1695 and 1714, was a British peer.

Background
Tankerville was the son of the book collector Bridget Bennett and John Bennet, 1st Baron Ossulston.

Political career
Tankerville succeeded his father in the barony in 1695 and was able to take a seat in the House of Lords. In 1714 he was created Earl of Tankerville, a revival of the title which had become extinct on the death of his father-in-law thirteen years earlier (see below). He was sworn of the Privy Council in 1716 and made a Knight of the Thistle in 1721.

Family
Lord Tankerville married Lady Mary, daughter of Ford Grey, 1st Earl of Tankerville, in 1695. He died in May 1722 and was succeeded in his titles by his son, Charles.

References

1674 births
1722 deaths
Earls in the Peerage of Great Britain
Knights of the Thistle
Members of the Privy Council of Great Britain
Place of birth missing